Cleric is a member of the clergy.

Cleric may also refer to:
Cleric (band), an American avant-garde metal band
Cleric (character class), a character class in fantasy role playing games
Cleric (Dungeons & Dragons), the specific character class from that game
The Clerics, a 2013 Indonesian film
The butterfly genus Amauris (friars and allies)
The Cleric, an alien in the Eradicator (comics)
The Grammaton Clerics, an order of mystic law enforcers in the 2002 film Equilibrium
Clergy, a 2018 Polish comedy-drama film